Benny's Bathtub (Original title: Bennys badekar) is a 1971 Danish animated film directed by Jannik Hastrup and Flemming Quist Møller. The film relates the story of a boy who flees the boring world of adults into a magical land in the bottom of his bathtub. The film featured the voices and songs of Peter Belli, Otto Brandenburg and Povl Dissing as well as the jazz music of Kenny Drew and Niels-Henning Ørsted Pedersen. Benny's Bathtub received a special Bodil Award for animated film in 1971 and is one of the ten films chosen for Denmark's cultural canon by the Danish Ministry of Culture.

Synopsis
It is the story of a boy named Benny who is bored in the apartment house where his parents do not have time to talk or play with him. Outdoors, Benny catches a tadpole which he takes home into the bathtub. Benny discovers the tadpole is an enchanted prince, who dives with Benny to the bottom of the bathtub and into a magical ocean world. In this fantastic world Benny meets pirates, mermaids and an octopus and experiences the things he misses in his daily life.

Cast

References

External links
 
 
Bennys badekar at the Danish Film Database (in Danish)
Bennys Uofficielle Badekar 

1971 animated films
1971 films
Danish animated films
Films directed by Jannik Hastrup
Danish Culture Canon